Tiverton by-election may refer to:

 1872 Tiverton by-election, following the resignation of George Denman
 1915 Tiverton by-election, following the death of William Walrond
 1923 Tiverton by-election, following the death of Herbert Sparkes
 1960 Tiverton by-election, following the elevation to the Lords of Derick Heathcoat-Amory
 2022 Tiverton and Honiton by-election, following the resignation of Neil Parish